Cliomantis dispar is a species of praying mantis in the family Nanomantidae.

See also
List of mantis genera and species

References

Cliomantis